Allan Alaküla (born 11 September 1968 in Kohtla-Järve) is an Estonian journalist.

Graduated from Tartu University history department (1993), refreshed in Birmingham University (1996) and Indian Institute of Mass Communication (2000).

Was President of Estonian Union of Journalists 2001–2004 and member of Estonian Press Council 1999–2003. Chairman of supervisory board of Tallinn Television July 2012-January 2017.

Worked as editorial writer in Estonian daily Postimees, as head of opinion department in daily Sõnumileht and as editor in chief in weekly Kesknädal. In Tallinn municipal administration held previously position of public relations director.

Head of Tallinn European Union Office in Brussels 2007 - 2020.

In 2021 January started blog of media-critics https://meediavaht.ee/ and is freelancing to different publications. Since 2021 September guides local tours in Lahemaa National Parc with nonprofit society Valgejõe Mälutalu  https://malutalu.webador.com/

21 November 2021 was elected elder/leader of Valgejõe village in Lahemaa.

References

1968 births
Living people
Estonian journalists
People from Kohtla-Järve
University of Tartu alumni